The Summit is a Canadian thriller drama television miniseries, which premiered in 2008. Directed by Nick Copus and written by John Krizanc, the miniseries centres on the preparations for an international Group of Seven summit of world leaders which is disrupted by a bioterrorism threat when mysterious forces plan to release an engineered drug-resistant strain of smallpox at the summit opening.

The miniseries stars Bruce Greenwood as Canadian Prime Minister Richard Adderly, Christopher Plummer as U.S. President P. J. Aimes, Wendy Crewson as presidential chief of staff Ellie Bruckner, James Purefoy as Centres for Disease Control investigator Thom Lightstone and Rachelle Lefevre as Adderly's anti-globalization activist daughter Leonie, as well as Mía Maestro, K. C. Collins, Nigel Bennett, Peter MacNeill, Lisa Ray, Stephen McHattie, Denis Akiyama and Raoul Bhaneja in supporting roles.

The miniseries was produced by Shaftesbury Films for the Canadian Broadcasting Corporation, with shooting taking place in England, Ecuador and locations throughout Ontario including Toronto, Hamilton, Huntsville, Parry Sound and Sudbury. Despite being a Canadian production commissioned by a Canadian network, it was aired in the United States by Ion Television in June 2008, in advance of its CBC Television premiere on July 29, 2009.

Awards
The series won three Gemini Awards at the 25th Gemini Awards in 2010, for Best Dramatic Miniseries, Best Original Music Score for a Dramatic Program, Mini-Series or TV Movie (Tom Third) and Best Achievement in Casting (John Buchan, Jason Knight). It was also nominated for Best Actor in a Dramatic Program or Mini-Series (Greenwood), Best Supporting Actor in a Dramatic Program or Mini-Series (Plummer), Best Supporting Actress in a Dramatic Program or Mini-Series (Crewson), Best Direction in a Dramatic Program or Mini-Series (Copus), Best Writing in a Dramatic Program or Mini-Series (Krizanc) and Best Makeup (Shauna Llewellyn, Carmela Dos Santos).

References

External links
 

2008 Canadian television series debuts
CBC Television original programming
Canadian political drama television series
2000s Canadian television miniseries
Television series by Shaftesbury Films
English-language Canadian films